Geoffrey Stanton "Geoff" Morrow (born 16 May 1942, in London, England) is a British songwriter and businessman. His compositions have been recorded by Butterscotch (of which he was a member), Sandie Shaw, the Carpenters, Elvis Presley, Johnny Mathis, Jessie J, Barry Manilow and many other musicians.

Biography
Many of his early compositions were co-written by David Martin and/or Chris Arnold, with whom he also recorded, both as the songwriting and production trio Arnold, Martin and Morrow and under the soft rock band name of Butterscotch. Fellow songwriter and producer Phil Wainman played the drums for Butterscotch.

Morrow and Arnold's first big songwriting success was "In Thoughts of You", taken to the top ten in the UK Singles Chart by Billy Fury in 1965. All three songwriters composed "Annabella", originally recorded in the UK by Dave Dee without chart success, but which reached the US charts via a cover version by Hamilton, Joe Frank & Reynolds in 1971. The writers themselves (as Butterscotch) scored another top twenty UK hit, when in 1970   "Don't You Know (She Said Hello)". reached number 17 in the UK Chart - a rating which belies its enduring popularity on oldies radio. The flipside of that single "The Closer to You" also proved to be very popular with some listeners. 

Arnold, Martin and Morrow went on to compose and produce a number of more or less successful songs through the early-mid 1970s - including "There's a Whole Lot of Loving" which provided Guys & Dolls with a UK #2 hit in 1974 - they also wrote and/or produced the group's follow up  hits.  Although the Guys & Dolls hits all appeared on Peter Shelley's Magnet label, in about 1975 the team started their own record label which was acronymically named "AMMO" - and several releases on that label achieved moderate success in the UK.  The team also wrote "Can't Smile Without You", made famous by Barry Manilow. Morrow also co-wrote four songs for Elvis Presley, with whom he spent time, and Presley made the song "Let's Be Friends" the title track of his 1970 compilation album.

Geoff Morrow established Geoff Morrow Music. One record company was sold to RCA and the other to EMI. In 1990, he bought the Manchester Opera House and Palace Theatre, Manchester. He was a director and major shareholder of Caesars Palace, Luton. His latest, A Legendary Romance, produced by Laurence Myers, successfully "tried out" in New Hampshire. He has also written several screenplays including Don't Go Breaking My Heart. Morrow collaborated with David Simmons to stage two plays.  These were Obits, a series of sketches based on obituaries, featuring characters including, Enid Blyton, Ernie Wise and Hitler; and The Boy Who Was Woody Allen, which has been adapted into a full scale musical comedy, Being Woody Allen, and was produced by Michael Grade and Michael Linnit in 2017.

See also
 Soft rock
 Beat music

References

External links
 Profile, BBC.co.uk. Retrieved 29 June 2015.
 

1942 births
Living people
English songwriters
English record producers
British soft rock musicians
People from Islington (district)
Businesspeople from London
Musicians from London